Boophis is the only genus in the mantellid frog subfamily Boophinae. They are commonly known as bright-eyed or skeleton frogs. They show typical 'tree frog' traits, and are a good example of convergent evolution with morphologically similar species in the families Hylidae and Rhacophoridae, among others. This genus can only be found on Madagascar and Mayotte Island (Comoros).

Taxonomy
The genus Boophis was described by Johann Jakob von Tschudi in 1838. It was originally considered a member of the African-Asian family Rhacophoridae, but was moved to the family Mantellidae in 2001, into its own subfamily, Boophinae Vences & Glaw, 2001.

Morphology
Boophis are arboreal frogs, exhibiting many traits that define 'tree frogs', such as expanded toe discs, long hindlimbs, and large eyes. Boophis are especially characterised by bright colouration of the iris, which is typically intricately patterned towards its inside, and often green or blue, but occasionally also red, purple, or yellow in the outer iris area. This has led to the vernacular name of bright-eyed frogs for the genus. Many species of Boophis have almost translucent skin, allowing bones and internal organs to be observed as in the unrelated glass frogs (Centrolenidae) of the tropical Americas. This has led to the vernacular name skeleton frogs for some members of the genus.

Species
The genus has presently nearly 80  species; new ones are being described every few months on average. This list may not be exhaustive.

 Boophis albilabris (Boulenger, 1888)
 Boophis albipunctatus Glaw & Thiesmeier, 1993
 Boophis andohahela Andreone, Nincheri & Piazza, 1995
 Boophis andrangoloaka (Ahl, 1928)
 Boophis andreonei Glaw & Vences, 1994
 Boophis anjanaharibeensis Andreone, 1996
 Boophis ankarafensis Penny, Andreone, Crottini, Holderied, Rakotozafy, Schwitzer & Rosa, 2014
 Boophis ankaratra Andreone, 1993
 Boophis arcanus Glaw, Köhler, de la Riva, Vieites & Vences, 2010
 Boophis axelmeyeri Vences, Andreone & Veities, 2005
 Boophis baetkei Köhler, Glaw & Vences, 2008
 Boophis blommersae Glaw & Vences, 1994
 Boophis boehmei Glaw & Vences, 1992
 Boophis boppa Hutter & Lambert, 2015
 Boophis bottae Vences & Glaw, 2002
 Boophis brachychir Boettger, 1882
 Boophis burgeri Glaw & Vences, 1994
 Boophis calcaratus Vallan, Vences & Glaw, 2010
 Boophis doulioti Angel, 1934
 Boophis elenae Andreone, 1993
 Boophis englaenderi Glaw & Vences, 1994
 Boophis entingae Glaw, Köhler, de la Riva, Vieites & Vences, 2010
 Boophis erythrodactylus (Guibé, 1953)
 Boophis fayi Köhler, Glaw, Rosa, Gehring, Pabijan, Andreone & Vences, 2011
 Boophis feonnyala Glaw, Vences, Andreone & Vallan, 2001
 Boophis goudotii Tschudi, 1838
 Boophis guibei (McCarthy, 1978)
 Boophis haematopus Glaw, Vences, Andreone & Vallan, 2001
 Boophis haingana Glaw, Köhler, de la Riva, Vieites & Vences, 2010
 Boophis idae (Steindachner, 1867)
 Boophis jaegeri Glaw & Vences, 1992 – Green Skeleton Frog
 Boophis laurenti Guibé, 1947
 Boophis liami Vallan, Vences & Glaw, 2003
 Boophis lichenoides Vallan, Glaw, Andreone & Cadle, 1998
 Boophis lilianae Köhler, Glaw & Vences, 2008
 Boophis luciae Glaw, Köhler, de la Riva, Vieites & Vences, 2010
 Boophis luteus (Boulenger, 1882)
 Boophis madagascariensis (Peters, 1874)
 Boophis majori (Boulenger, 1896)
 Boophis mandraka Blommers-Schlösser, 1979
 Boophis marojezensis Glaw & Vences, 1994
 Boophis masoala Glaw, Scherz, Prötzel & Vences, 2018
 Boophis miadana Glaw, Köhler, de la Riva, Vieites & Vences, 2010
 Boophis microtympanum (Boettger, 1881)
 Boophis miniatus (Mocquard, 1902)
 Boophis narinsi Vences, Gehara, Köhler & Glaw, 2012
 Boophis nauticus Glaw, Hawlitschek, Glaw, and Vences, 2019
 Boophis obscurus (Boettger, 1913)
 Boophis occidentalis Glaw & Vences, 1994
 Boophis opisthodon (Boulenger, 1888)
 Boophis pauliani (Guibé, 1953)
 Boophis periegetes Cadle, 1995
 Boophis picturatus Glaw, Vences, Andreone & Vallan, 2001
 Boophis piperatus Glaw, Köhler, de la Riva, Vieites & Vences, 2010
 Boophis popi Köhler, Glaw, Rosa, Gehring, Pabijan, Andreone & Vences, 2011
 Boophis praedictus Glaw, Köhler, de la Riva, Vieites & Vences, 2010
 Boophis pyrrhus Glaw, Vences, Andreone & Vallan, 2001
 Boophis quasiboehmei Vences, Köhler, Crottini & Glaw, 2010
 Boophis rappiodes (Ahl, 1928)
 Boophis reticulatus Blommers-Schlösser, 1979
 Boophis rhodoscelis (Boulenger, 1882)
 Boophis roseipalmatus Glaw, Köhler, de la Riva, Vieites & Vences, 2010
 Boophis rufioculis Glaw & Vences, 1997
 Boophis sambirano Vences & Glaw, 2005
 Boophis sandrae Glaw, Köhler, de la Riva, Vieites & Vences, 2010
 Boophis schuboeae Glaw & Vences, 2002
 Boophis septentrionalis Glaw & Vences, 1994
 Boophis sibilans Glaw & Thiesmeier, 1993
 Boophis solomaso Vallan, Vences & Glaw, 2003
 Boophis spinophis Glaw, Köhler, de la Riva, Vieites & Vences, 2010
 Boophis tampoka Köhler, Glaw & Vences, 2007
 Boophis tasymena Vences & Glaw, 2002
 Boophis tephraeomystax (Duméril, 1853)
 Boophis tsilomaro Vences, Andreone, Glos & Glaw, 2010
 Boophis ulftunni Wollenberg, Andreone, Glaw & Vences, 2008
 Boophis viridis Blommers-Schlösser, 1979
 Boophis vittatus Glaw, Vences, Andreone & Vallan, 2001
 Boophis williamsi (Guibé, 1974)
 Boophis xerophilus Glaw & Vences, 1997

References

 
Amphibians of Sub-Saharan Africa
Endemic fauna of Madagascar
Amphibian genera
Fauna of Mayotte
Taxa named by Johann Jakob von Tschudi
Taxonomy articles created by Polbot